William Harvey was a department store located in Guildford.

History
William Harvey bought a general drapery store in Guildford in 1922 developing the business into a department store with a slant on fashion. In 1946 the business was incorporated and two years later moved into new premises opposite. However the move had put the company into financial problems, and in 1950 the business was offered to Harrods who declined. In April 1951 the business was put into voluntary liquidation, with a new company by the same name being set up to operate the store.

The new company however did not stay independent for long, and in 1953 the expanding department store group Army & Navy purchased the business. The Guildford store was subsequently expanded by Army & Navy, who continued to operate William Harvey as a subsidiary, with five new floors and a roof garden. They also branded a new store located in Camberley Harveys which opened in 1964.

Army & Navy was purchased by House of Fraser in 1973, and subsequently put in place a group system for its department stores. Army & Navy was decided to be the brand for its South East stores, and both the Guildford and Camberley stores were re-branded in 1974 as Army & Navy. Both stores are still open but now operate under the House of Fraser name.

References

Harvey William
Defunct retail companies of the United Kingdom
Retail companies established in 1922
Retail companies disestablished in 1974
Harvey William
1922 establishments in England
1974 disestablishments in England
British companies disestablished in 1974
British companies established in 1922